Hidden Kingdom may refer to:
Gondolin
Doriath
Hidden Kingdoms, a documentary series narrated by Stephen Fry
Hidden Kingdom (role-playing game), a role-playing game
Hidden Kingdom, a 1996 album by Rodney Whitaker

See also